Frederick J. Kurz (3 September 1918 – 28 November 1978) was an English professional footballer who played as a forward. He made 148 appearances in the English Football League for Crystal Palace and also played for Grimsby Town. He concluded his career in non-league football with Boston United.

Playing career
Kurz began his youth career in local football with Grimsby YMCA. In 1938, he signed for Grimsby Town but made only three senior appearances before his career was interrupted by World War II. He made wartime football appearances for Crystal Palace before signing for the club on a regular basis on 26 December 1945. When League football resumed in 1946–47, Palace played in the Third Division South. Kurz made 36 appearances that season, scoring five times. Over the subsequent four seasons he made 33 (18 goals), 37 (12 goals), 25 (10 goals), and 17 (3 goals) appearances respectively.

In August 1951, Kurz moved on to Boston United.

Personal life
Fred Kurz died on 28 November 1978, aged 60.

References

External links

Fred Kurz at holmesdale.net

1918 births
1978 deaths
Footballers from Grimsby
Association football forwards
English Football League players
Grimsby Town F.C. players
Crystal Palace F.C. players
Boston United F.C. players
English footballers